Jowzurdan-e Olya (Romanized as Jowzūrdān-e ‘Olyā; also known as Gowdīzhdū, Jowzadān-e ‘Olyā, and Jowzardān-e Bālā) is a village in Raqqeh Rural District, Eresk District, Boshruyeh County, South Khorasan Province, Iran. In the 2006 census, its population was 93, in 32 families.

References 

Populated places in Boshruyeh County